NGC 7027, also known as the Jewel Bug Nebula, is a very young and dense planetary nebula located around  from Earth in the constellation Cygnus. Discovered in 1878 by Édouard Stephan using the  reflector at Marseille Observatory, it is one of the smallest planetary nebulae and by far the most extensively studied.

Overview
NGC 7027 is one of the visually brightest planetary nebulae. It is about 600 years old.

It is unusually small, measuring only 0.2 by 0.1 light-years, whereas the typical size for a planetary nebula is 1 light-year. It has a very complex shape, consisting of an elliptical region of ionized gas within a massive neutral cloud. The inner structure is surrounded by a translucent shroud of gas and dust. The nebula is shaped like a prolate ellipsoidal shell and contains a photodissociation region shaped like a "clover leaf". The central regions of NGC 7027 have been found to emit X-rays, indicating very high temperatures. Surrounding the ellipsoidal nebula are a series of faint, blue concentric shells.

It is possible that the central white dwarf of NGC 7027 has an accretion disk that acts as a source of high temperatures. The white dwarf is believed to have a mass approximately 0.7 times the mass of the Sun and is radiating at 7,700 times the Sun's luminosity. NGC 7027 is currently in a short phase of planetary nebula evolution in which molecules in its envelope are being dissociated into their component atoms, and the atoms are being ionized.

The expanding halo of NGC 7027 has a mass of about three times the mass of the Sun, and is about 100 times more massive than the ionized central region. This mass loss in NGC 7027 provided important evidence that stars a few times more massive than the Sun can avoid being destroyed in supernova explosions.

NGC 7027 has a rich and highly ionized spectrum caused by its hot central star. The nebula is rich in carbon, and is a very interesting object for the study of carbon chemistry in dense molecular material exposed to strong ultraviolet radiation. The spectrum of NGC 7027 contains fewer spectral lines from neutral molecules than is usual for planetary nebulae. This is due to the destruction of neutral molecules by intense UV radiation. The nebula contains ions of extremely high ionization potential. The helium hydride ion, thought to be the earliest molecule to have been formed in the Universe (about 100,000 years after the Big Bang), was detected in 2019 for the first time in space in NGC 7027. There is also evidence for the presence of nanodiamond in NGC 7027.

It has been photographed multiple times by the Hubble Space Telescope since its launch in 1990. Prior to these observations, NGC 7027 was thought to be a proto-planetary nebula with the central star too cool to ionize any of the gas, but it is now known to be a planetary nebula in the earliest stage of its development. The progenitor star is believed to have been about 3 to 4 times the mass of the Sun before the nebula was formed.

In 1977 at Yerkes Observatory, a small Schmidt telescope was used to derive an accurate optical position for the planetary nebula NGC 7027 to allow comparison between photographs and radio maps of the object.

In a 6" telescope at around 50× it appears as a relatively bright bluish star. It is best viewed with the highest magnification possible.

See also
List of NGC objects

References

External links

Protoplanetary nebulae
Planetary nebulae
7027
Cygnus (constellation)